Lazarevo is a rural locality (a village) in Vereshchaginsky District, Perm Krai, Russia. The population was 7 as of 2010.

Geography 
Lazarevo is located 46 km west of Vereshchagino (the district's administrative centre) by road. Tanenki is the nearest rural locality.

References 

Rural localities in Vereshchaginsky District